Devendra Singh Yadav (born 1 January 1951) is an Indian politician for the Etah (Lok Sabha Constituency) in Uttar Pradesh.

External links
 Official biographical sketch in Parliament of India website

1951 births
Living people
People from Uttar Pradesh
People from Ghaziabad, Uttar Pradesh
India MPs 2004–2009
India MPs 1999–2004
People from Etah
Samajwadi Party politicians from Uttar Pradesh